The kilogram (also kilogramme) is the unit of mass in the International System of Units (SI), having the unit symbol kg. It is a widely used measure in science, engineering and commerce worldwide, and is often simply called a kilo colloquially. It means 'one thousand grams'.

The kilogram is defined in terms of the second and the metre, both of which are based on fundamental physical constants. This allows a properly equipped metrology laboratory to calibrate a mass measurement instrument such as a Kibble balance as the primary standard to determine an exact kilogram mass.

The kilogram was originally defined in 1795 as the mass of one litre of water. The current definition of a kilogram agrees with this original definition to within 30 parts per million. In 1799, the platinum Kilogramme des Archives replaced it as the standard of mass. In 1889, a cylinder of platinum-iridium, the International Prototype of the Kilogram (IPK), became the standard of the unit of mass for the metric system and remained so for 130 years, before the current standard was adopted in 2019.

Definition 
The kilogram is defined in terms of three fundamental physical constants:  

 a specific atomic transition frequency , which defines the duration of the second,
 the speed of light , which when combined with the second, defines the length of the metre,
 and the Planck constant . which when combined with the metre and second, defines the mass of the kilogram.

The formal definition according to the General Conference on Weights and Measures (CGPM) is:

Defined in term of those units, the kg is formulated as:
kg =    =  ≈  .

This definition is generally consistent with previous definitions: the mass remains within 30 ppm of the mass of one litre of water.

Timeline of previous definitions

 1793: The grave (the precursor of the kilogram) was defined as the mass of 1 litre (dm3) of water, which was determined to be 18841 grains. 
 1795: the gram (1/1000 of a kilogram) was provisionally defined as the mass of one cubic centimetre of water at the melting point of ice.
 1799: The Kilogramme des Archives was manufactured as a prototype. It had a mass equal to the mass of 1 dm3 of water at the temperature of its maximum density, which is approximately 4 °C.
 1875–1889: The Metre Convention was signed in 1875, leading to the production of the International Prototype of the Kilogram (IPK) in 1879 and its adoption in 1889. 
 2019: The kilogram was defined in terms of the Planck constant, the speed of light and hyperfine transition frequency of 133Cs as approved by the General Conference on Weights and Measures (CGPM) on November 16, 2018.

Name and terminology
The kilogram is the only base SI unit with an SI prefix (kilo) as part of its name.
The word  was written into French law in 1795, in the Decree of 18 Germinal,
In the decree of 1795, the term  thus replaced , and  replaced .

The French spelling was adopted in Great Britain when the word was used for the first time in English in 1795, with the spelling kilogram being adopted in the United States. In the United Kingdom both spellings are used, with "kilogram" having become by far the more common. UK law regulating the units to be used when trading by weight or measure does not prevent the use of either spelling.

While kilo as an alternative is acceptable, to The Economist for example, the Canadian government's Termium Plus system states that "SI (International System of Units) usage, followed in scientific and technical writing" does not allow its usage and it is described as "a common informal name" on Russ Rowlett's Dictionary of Units of Measurement. When the United States Congress gave the metric system legal status in 1866, it permitted the use of the word kilo as an alternative to the word kilogram, but in 1990 revoked the status of the word kilo.

The SI system was introduced in 1960 and in 1970 the BIPM started publishing the SI Brochure, which contains all relevant decisions and recommendations by the CGPM concerning units. The SI Brochure states that "It is not permissible to use abbreviations for unit symbols or unit names ...".

Kilogram becoming a base unit: the role of units for electromagnetism
It is primarily because of units for electromagnetism that the kilogram rather than the gram was eventually adopted as the base unit of mass in the SI. The relevant series of discussions and decisions started roughly in the 1850s and effectively concluded in 1946. By the end of the 19th century, the 'practical units' for electric and magnetic quantities such as the ampere and the volt were well established in practical use (e.g. for telegraphy). Unfortunately, they did not form a coherent system of units with the then-prevailing base units for length and mass, the centimetre, and the gram. However, the 'practical units' also included some purely mechanical units. In particular, the product of the ampere and the volt gives a purely mechanical unit of power, the watt. It was noticed that the purely mechanical practical units such as the watt would be coherent in a system in which the base unit of length was the metre and the base unit of mass was the kilogram. Because no one wanted to replace the second as the base unit of time, the metre and the kilogram are the only pair of base units of length and mass such that (1) the watt is a coherent unit of power, (2) the base units of length and time are integer-power-of-ten ratios to the metre and the gram (so that the system remains 'metric'), and (3) the sizes of the base units of length and mass are convenient for practical use. This would still leave out the purely electrical and magnetic units: while the purely mechanical practical units such as the watt are coherent in the metre-kilogram-second system, the explicitly electrical and magnetic units such as the volt, the ampere, etc. are not. The only way to also make those units coherent with the metre-kilogram-second system is to modify that system in a different way: the number of fundamental dimensions must be increased from three (length, mass, and time) to four (the previous three, plus one purely electrical one).

The state of units for electromagnetism at the end of the 19th century

During the second half of the 19th century, the centimetre–gram–second system of units was becoming widely accepted for scientific work, treating the gram as the fundamental unit of mass and the kilogram as a decimal multiple of the base unit formed by using a metric prefix. However, as the century drew to a close, there was widespread dissatisfaction with the units for electricity and magnetism in the CGS system: they were so small (or large) that realistic measurements involved very large (or small) numbers. There were two obvious choices for absolute units of electromagnetism: the ‘electrostatic’ (CGS-ESU) system and the ‘electromagnetic’ (CGS-EMU) system.

To circumvent this difficulty, a third set of units was introduced: the so-called practical units. The practical units were obtained as decimal multiples of coherent CGS-EMU units, chosen so that the resulting magnitudes were convenient for practical use and so that the practical units were, as far as possible, coherent with each other. The practical units included such units as the volt, the ampere, the ohm, etc., which were later incorporated in the SI system and which are used to this day. The reason the metre and the kilogram were later chosen to be the base units of length and mass was that they are the only combination of reasonably sized decimal multiples or submultiples of the metre and the gram that can be made coherent with the volt, the ampere, etc.

The reason is that electrical quantities cannot be isolated from mechanical and thermal ones: they are connected by relations such as current × electric potential difference  power. For this reason, the practical system also included coherent units for certain mechanical quantities. For example, the previous equation implies that ampere × volt is a coherent derived practical unit of power; this unit was named the watt. The coherent unit of energy is then the watt times the second, which was named the joule. The joule and the watt also have convenient magnitudes and are decimal multiples of CGS coherent units for energy (the erg) and power (the erg per second). The watt is not coherent in the centimetre-gram-second system, but it is coherent in the metre-kilogram-second system—and in no other system whose base units of length and mass are reasonably sized decimal multiples or submultiples of the metre and the gram.

However, unlike the watt and the joule, the explicitly electrical and magnetic units (the volt, the ampere...) are not coherent even in the (absolute three-dimensional) metre-kilogram-second system. Indeed, one can work out what the base units of length and mass have to be in order for all the practical units to be coherent (the watt and the joule as well as the volt, the ampere, etc.).

Therefore, the full absolute system of units in which the practical electrical units are coherent is the quadrant–eleventh-gram–second (QES) system. However, the extremely inconvenient magnitudes of the base units for length and mass made it so that no one seriously considered adopting the QES system. Thus, people working on practical applications of electricity had to use units for electrical quantities and for energy and power that were not coherent with the units they were using for e.g. length, mass, and force.

Meanwhile, scientists developed yet another fully coherent absolute system, which came to be called the Gaussian system, in which the units for purely electrical quantities are taken from CGE-ESU, while the units for magnetic quantities are taken from the CGS-EMU. This system proved very convenient for scientific work and is still widely used. However, the sizes of its units remained either too large or too small—by many orders of magnitude—for practical applications.

Finally, in both CGS-ESU and CGS-EMU as well as in the Gaussian system, Maxwell's equations are 'unrationalized', meaning that they contain various factors of  that many workers found awkward. So yet another system was developed to rectify that: the 'rationalized' Gaussian system, usually called the Heaviside–Lorentz system. This system is still used in some subfields of physics.

The Giorgi proposal

In 1901, Giovanni Giorgi proposed a new system of units that would remedy this situation. He noted that the mechanical practical units such as the joule and the watt are coherent not only in the QES system, but also in the metre-kilogram-second (MKS) system. It was of course known that adopting the metre and the kilogram as base units—obtaining the three dimensional MKS system—would not solve the problem: while the watt and the joule would be coherent, this would not be so for the volt, the ampere, the ohm, and the rest of the practical units for electric and magnetic quantities (the only three-dimensional absolute system in which all practical units are coherent is the QES system).

But Giorgi pointed out that the volt and the rest could be made coherent if the idea that all physical quantities must be expressible in terms of dimensions of length, mass, and time, is relinquished and a fourth base dimension is added for electric quantities. Any practical electrical unit could be chosen as the new fundamental unit, independent from the metre, kilogram, and second. Likely candidates for the fourth independent unit included the coulomb, the ampere, the volt, and the ohm, but eventually, the ampere proved to be the most convenient for metrology. Moreover, the freedom gained by making an electric unit independent from the mechanical units could be used to rationalize Maxwell's equations.

The idea that one should give up on having a purely 'absolute' system (i.e. one where only length, mass, and time are the base dimensions) was a departure from a viewpoint that seemed to underlie the early breakthroughs by Gauss and Weber (especially their famous 'absolute measurements' of Earth's magnetic field), and it took some time for the scientific community to accept it—not least because many scientists clung to the notion that the dimensions of a quantity in terms of length, mass, and time somehow specify its 'fundamental physical nature'.:24, 26

Acceptance of the Giorgi system, leading to the MKSA system and the SI

By the 1920s, dimensional analysis had become much better understood and it was becoming widely accepted that the choice of both the number and of the identities of the "fundamental" dimensions should be dictated by convenience only and that there is nothing really fundamental about the dimensions of a quantity. In 1935, Giorgi's proposal was adopted by the IEC as the Giorgi system. It is this system that has since then been called the MKS system,
although ‘MKSA’ appears in careful usage. In 1946 the CIPM approved a proposal to adopt the ampere as the electromagnetic unit of the "MKSA system". In 1948 the CGPM commissioned the CIPM "to make recommendations for a single practical system of units of measurement, suitable for adoption by all countries adhering to the Metre Convention". This led to the launch of SI in 1960.

To summarize, the ultimate reason that the kilogram was chosen over the gram as the base unit of mass was, in one word, the volt-ampere. Namely, the combination of the metre and the kilogram was the only choice of base units of length and mass such that 1. the volt-ampere—which is also called the watt and which is the unit of power in the practical system of electrical units—is coherent, 2. the base units of length and mass are decimal multiples or submultiples of the metre and the gram, and 3. the base units of length and mass have convenient sizes.

The CGS and MKS systems co-existed during much of the early-to-mid-20th century, but as a result of the decision to adopt the "Giorgi system" as the international system of units in 1960, the kilogram is now the SI base unit for mass, while the definition of the gram is derived.

Redefinition based on fundamental constants

The replacement of the International Prototype of the Kilogram (IPK) as the primary standard was motivated by evidence accumulated over a long period of time that the mass of the IPK and its replicas had been changing; the IPK had diverged from its replicas by approximately 50 micrograms since their manufacture late in the 19th century. This led to several competing efforts to develop measurement technology precise enough to warrant replacing the kilogram artefact with a definition based directly on physical fundamental constants. Physical standard masses such as the IPK and its replicas still serve as secondary standards.

The International Committee for Weights and Measures (CIPM) approved a redefinition of the SI base units in November 2018 that defines the kilogram by defining the Planck constant to be exactly , effectively defining the kilogram in terms of the second and the metre. The new definition took effect on May 20, 2019.

Prior to the redefinition, the kilogram and several other SI units based on the kilogram were defined by a man-made metal artifact: the Kilogramme des Archives from 1799 to 1889, and the IPK from 1889 to 2019.

In 1960, the metre, previously similarly having been defined with reference to a single platinum-iridium bar with two marks on it, was redefined in terms of an invariant physical constant (the wavelength of a particular emission of light emitted by krypton, and later the speed of light) so that the standard can be independently reproduced in different laboratories by following a written specification.

At the 94th Meeting of the International Committee for Weights and Measures (CIPM) in 2005, it was recommended that the same be done with the kilogram.

In October 2010, the CIPM voted to submit a resolution for consideration at the General Conference on Weights and Measures (CGPM), to "take note of an intention" that the kilogram be defined in terms of the Planck constant,  (which has dimensions of energy times time, thus mass × length / time) together with other physical constants. This resolution was accepted by the 24th conference of the CGPM in October 2011 and further discussed at the 25th conference in 2014. Although the Committee recognised that significant progress had been made, they concluded that the data did not yet appear sufficiently robust to adopt the revised definition, and that work should continue to enable the adoption at the 26th meeting, scheduled for 2018. Such a definition would theoretically permit any apparatus that was capable of delineating the kilogram in terms of the Planck constant to be used as long as it possessed sufficient precision, accuracy and stability. The Kibble balance is one way to do this.

As part of this project, a variety of very different technologies and approaches were considered and explored over many years. Some of these approaches were based on equipment and procedures that would enable the reproducible production of new, kilogram-mass prototypes on demand (albeit with extraordinary effort) using measurement techniques and material properties that are ultimately based on, or traceable to, physical constants. Others were based on devices that measured either the acceleration or weight of hand-tuned kilogram test masses and which expressed their magnitudes in electrical terms via special components that permit traceability to physical constants. All approaches depend on converting a weight measurement to a mass and therefore require the precise measurement of the strength of gravity in laboratories. All approaches would have precisely fixed one or more constants of nature at a defined value.

SI multiples 

Because an SI unit may not have multiple prefixes (see SI prefix), prefixes are added to gram, rather than the base unit kilogram, which already has a prefix as part of its name. For instance, one-millionth of a kilogram is 1mg (one milligram), not 1μkg (one microkilogram).

 The microgram is typically abbreviated "mcg" in pharmaceutical and nutritional supplement labelling, to avoid confusion, since the "μ" prefix is not always well recognised outside of technical disciplines. (The expression "mcg" is also the symbol for an obsolete CGS unit of measure known as the "millicentigram", which is equal to 10μg.)
 In the United Kingdom, because serious medication errors have been made from the confusion between milligrams and micrograms when micrograms has been abbreviated, the recommendation given in the Scottish Palliative Care Guidelines is that doses of less than one milligram must be expressed in micrograms and that the word microgram must be written in full, and that it is never acceptable to use "mcg" or "μg".
 The hectogram (100 g) (Italian: ettogrammo or etto) is a very commonly used unit in the retail food trade in Italy.
 The former standard spelling and abbreviation "deka-" and "dk" produced abbreviations such as "dkm" (dekametre) and "dkg" (dekagram).  the abbreviation "dkg" (10 g) is still used in parts of central Europe in retail for some foods such as cheese and meat.
 The unit name megagram is rarely used, and even then typically only in technical fields in contexts where especially rigorous consistency with the SI standard is desired. For most purposes, the name tonne is instead used. The tonne and its symbol, "t", were adopted by the CIPM in 1879. It is a non-SI unit accepted by the BIPM for use with the SI. According to the BIPM, "This unit is sometimes referred to as 'metric ton' in some English-speaking countries." The unit name megatonne or megaton (Mt) is often used in general-interest literature on greenhouse gas emissions and nuclear weapons yields, whereas the equivalent unit in scientific papers on the subject is often the teragram (Tg).

See also

 1795 in science
 1799 in science
 General Conference on Weights and Measures (CGPM)
 Gram
 Grave (original name of the kilogram, its history)
 Gravimetry
 Inertia
 International Bureau of Weights and Measures (BIPM)
 International Committee for Weights and Measures (CIPM)
 International System of Units (SI)
 Kibble balance
 Kilogram-force
 Litre
 Mass
 Mass versus weight
 Metric system
 Metric ton
 Milligram per cent
 National Institute of Standards and Technology (NIST)
 Newton
 SI base units
 Standard gravity
 Weight

Notes

References

External links 

 NIST Improves Accuracy of 'Watt Balance' Method for Defining the Kilogram
 The UK's National Physical Laboratory (NPL): [https://web.archive.org/web/20160323212037/http://www.npl.co.uk/reference/faqs/are-any-problems-caused-by-having-the-kilogram-defined-in-terms-of-a-physical-artefact-(faq-mass-and-density) Are any problems caused by having the kilogram defined in terms of a physical artefact? (FAQ – Mass & Density)]
 NPL: NPL Kibble balance
 Metrology in France: Watt balance
 Australian National Measurement Institute: Redefining the kilogram through the Avogadro constant
 International Bureau of Weights and Measures (BIPM): Home page
 NZZ Folio: What a kilogram really weighs
 NPL: [http://www.npl.co.uk/reference/faqs/what-are-the-differences-between-mass,-weight,-force-and-load-(faq-mass-and-density) What are the differences between mass, weight, force and load?]
 BBC: Getting the measure of a kilogram
 NPR: This Kilogram Has A Weight-Loss Problem, an interview with National Institute of Standards and Technology physicist Richard Steiner
 Avogadro and molar Planck constants for the redefinition of the kilogram
 Realization of the awaited definition of the kilogram

Videos
 The BIPM – YouTube channel
 "The role of the Planck constant in physics" – presentation at 26th CGPM meeting at Versailles, France, November 2018 when voting on superseding the IPK took place on YouTube

SI base units
Units of mass
1000 (number)